Everyday People is a 2004 American drama television film written and directed by Jim McKay. The storyline revolves around the lives of the employees working at a restaurant in Brooklyn, New York City, which is to be closed down due to economic shortfall. The film first screened at the 2004 Sundance Film Festival and later premiered on HBO on June 26, 2004.

Plot
The film takes place on a day in Brooklyn. The owner of a neighborhood diner has decided to shut down his restaurant but, on the day of the deal, he reconsiders, realizing that people's lives depend on it. In the meantime, this shutdown announcement puts a heavy impact on the employees, as they become uncertain about the future. The movie does not have an explicit ending as to whether the diner was shut down or not.

Cast
Jordan Gelber as Ira
Stephen McKinley Henderson as Arthur
muMs da Schemer as Ali
Reg E. Cathey as Akbar
Ron Butler as Ron Harding
Jamie Hector as Devon
Steve Axelrod as Sol
Earl Baker Jr. as Benjamin
Bridget Barkan as Joleen
Kalimi Baxter as Ruby
Ron Ben Israel as Walter
Stephanie Berry as Angry Black Waiter
Miles Bridgett as Joleen's Son
David Brummel as Ira's Father
Kadijah Carlisle as Benita
Julia Carothers Hughes as Miss Meyers
Frantz G. Saint Louis Jr. as Frantz

Reception
The film has an approval rating of 67% based on 9 reviews on Rotten Tomatoes. Positive reviews praised the film for its genuine representation of the struggles of low-income people. Keith Phipps of The A.V. Club wrote, "Though it lacks some of the New York naturalism of McKay's wonderful, little-seen Our Song, the ensemble drama still makes a quiet, passionate argument that places where patrons can ask for their regular spot are what make a neighborhood, whatever the allure of bright lights and brand names." 

The film was nominated for four Black Reel Awards in 2005 in the categories of Best Supporting Actor, Best Supporting Actress, and Best Screenplay.

References

External links

2004 television films
2004 films
2004 drama films
2004 independent films
2000s American films
2000s English-language films
American drama television films
American independent films
Films set in Brooklyn
Films set in restaurants
HBO Films films